WJXN-FM (100.9 MHz) is a radio station serving the Jackson, Mississippi area, broadcasting a worship music format. The station is owned by Memphis, Tennessee-based Flinn Broadcasting. Its studios are located in Ridgeland, and the transmitter site is in Crystal Springs, Mississippi.

History
In October, 1990, WJXN (then at 92.9) began broadcasting.  At that time, its format was top-40, and was branded 92.9 The Heat.

But The Heat had been turned off after just a few months.

In 1991, WJXN switched to oldies.  It was branded J92.  But WJXN didn't have oldies for long.

In 1992, WJXN made another switch--to country.  It was branded Star 92.  But WJXN didn't have country for long.

Later that year, WJXN started simulcasting WOAD.  WOAD's then-owner Holt Communications had leased WJXN, and had even changed the call sign to WOAD-FM.

In December, 1997, WJXN was sold to Flinn Broadcasting.

In December, 1999, WJXN swapped frequencies with WDXO, and moved to 100.9.

For several years, WJXN-FM had been leased by the then-California-based Educational Media Foundation, and was affiliated with K-Love until 2012.

Then, on July 26, 2012—when it was leased by Meridian, Mississippi-based New South Radio (then doing business as The Radio People; now known as Digio Strategies)--WJXN-FM had first switched to adult hits, branded as 100.9 Jack FM.

On March 1, 2014 at midnight, WJXN-FM began stunting; on March 3, the station relaunched as classic country-formatted 100.9 The Legend.

In March 2017, New South Radio had acquired WHJT from Mississippi College. On July 31 of that year, the classic country format moved to WHJT, with New South Radio terminating its lease on WJXN-FM (which had gone briefly silent).

On October 9, 2017 after two months of silence, WJXN-FM returned to the air with classic hip-hop, billing itself as Hot 100.9. During this three-month tenure, the station utilized national programming from Westwood One's Classic Hip-Hop network.

On January 5, 2018 after nearly three months of being Hot, WJXN-FM was rebranded as g 100.9, this time under an LMA deal with Alpha Media, who in turn replaced the Westwood One programming with Alpha's in-house presentation, thus putting it in line with Alpha's g-branded stations.

On February 19, 2021 WJXN-FM flipped back to adult hits, again as Jack FM. A portion of its signal overlaps that of WDXO (92.9 Jack FM) Hazlehurst.

On January 1, 2023 WJXN-FM dropped the "Jack FM" adult hits format due to Alpha Media's operation of the station coming to an end. WJXN-FM has temporarily switched to EMF's Air 1 worship music format.

Previous logo

References

External links

JXN-FM
Adult hits radio stations in the United States